Ernstichthys is a genus of banjo catfishes that occurs in the Amazon and Orinoco basins.

The genus was named in honor of the Chair of Natural Science at the Central University of Venezuela biologist Adolfo (also spelled Adolf) Ernst (1832-1899).

Ernstichthys species are small to medium-sized, armored aspredinids.  Members of this genus are distinguished from all other aspredinids by having two sets of paired pre-anal-fin plates and a strongly recurved pectoral spine that is much longer than first branched pectoral-fin ray.

Species 
There are currently three described species in this genus:
 Ernstichthys anduzei Fernández-Yépez, 1953
 Ernstichthys intonsus D. J. Stewart, 1985
 Ernstichthys megistus (Orcés-V. (es), 1961)

References

External links

Aspredinidae
Taxa named by Augustín Fernández-Yépez
Fish of South America
Fish of the Amazon basin
Fauna of Ecuador
Fauna of Peru
Fish of Venezuela
Catfish genera